"Grindin'" is the debut single from Virginia Beach rap duo Clipse. The song was produced by The Neptunes, and featured on the Clipse's debut album, Lord Willin'. The song became a summer Top 40 hit, reaching number 30 on the Billboard Hot 100 on the issue dated August 10, 2002.

The song's beat was far more sparse in its percussive drum and woodblock arrangement than most popular hip-hop tracks at the time, predating later sparse Neptunes productions like Snoop Dogg's "Drop It Like It's Hot" that would further capitalize and expand on this style.

There were two official remixes released: one featuring new verses by Pusha T and Malice featuring Noreaga, Birdman and Lil Wayne, and the other, a selector remix featuring dancehall artists Sean Paul, Bless and Kardinal Offishall. Both remixes feature the same instrumental but a different verse performed by Pusha T.

Pusha T stated that Pharrell nearly gave the beat to Jay-Z.

The song is featured in the popular video games Saints Row and NBA 2K15. The intro was also used in the 2003 comedy film Malibu's Most Wanted.

The song's instrumental was sampled in Chris Brown's 2019 song "Sorry Enough", and later in the ensemble track "Friday Night Cypher" by Big Sean, as one of the 7 beats used (this sample was used twice in the track).

Reception
Pitchfork ranked the song at number 27 in "The Top 500 of the Tracks of the 2000s". The song was also listed at number 84 in Rolling Stone'''s best songs of the 2000s and at number 281 on their top 500 best songs of all time. Hip-hop writer Shea Serrano listed the song as the most important rap song of 2002 in his book The Rap Yearbook''.

Charts

Weekly charts

Year-end charts

References

2002 singles
Clipse songs
Song recordings produced by the Neptunes
Songs written by Pusha T
Songs written by Pharrell Williams
Songs written by Chad Hugo